Ross Divorty (born 27 November 1988) is a Welsh former professional rugby league footballer who played in the 2000s and 2010s.

Background
Ross Divorty was born in York, England, and he is the son of the rugby league footballer; Gary Divorty.

Playing career

Club career
Ross Divorty made his début for Featherstone Rovers on Saturday 13 June 2009, and he played his last match for Featherstone Rovers during the 2011 season.

International honours
Although born in England, Divorty has a Welsh grandmother, making him eligible to play for Wales. He earned Wales caps playing in the 2009 European Cup, culminating in an appearance in the final at Bridgend's Brewery Field. He scored his first tries for Wales in the group stages of this tournament, scoring twice in an 88–8 win over Serbia. In October 2013, Ross played in the 2013 Rugby League World Cup.

References

1988 births
Living people
Doncaster R.L.F.C. players
Featherstone Rovers players
Halifax R.L.F.C. players
Rugby league locks
Rugby league players from York
Rugby league second-rows
Wales national rugby league team players
Welsh rugby league players
York City Knights players